Erodium moschatum is a species of flowering plant in the geranium family known by the common names musk stork's-bill and whitestem filaree. This is a weedy annual or biennial herb which is native to much of Eurasia and North Africa but can be found on most continents where it is an introduced species. The young plant starts with a flat rosette of compound leaves, each leaf up to 15 centimeters long with many oval-shaped highly lobed and toothed leaflets along a central vein which is hairy, white, and stemlike. The plant grows to a maximum of about half a meter in height with plentiful fuzzy green foliage. The small flowers have five sepals behind five purple or lavender petals, each petal just over a centimeter long. The filaree fruit has a small, glandular body with a long green style up to 4 centimeters in length.

Like Erodium cicutarium, the species is edible.

References

External links 

Jepson Manual Treatment
Photo gallery

moschatum
Edible plants
Flora of Lebanon and Syria